Genevieve is the second album released by the black metal band Velvet Cacoon.

Release history
CD version released by Full Moon Productions in 2004.

LP version released by Southern Lord in June 2007 with a jacket made of velvet with the logo in silver foil. Limited to 1500 copies, 500 being marble-purple.

Track listing

All songs written by Velvet Cacoon.

Personnel
Velvet Cacoon - All

Velvet Cacoon albums
2004 albums
Full Moon Productions albums